Ponte Cavour is a bridge in Rome (Italy), connecting Piazza del Porto di Ripetta to Lungotevere dei Mellini, in the Rioni Campo Marzio and Prati.

Since the postwar period, in the morning of 1 January of each year the tradition of diving into the Tiber is renewed by swimmers jumping from the parapet of the bridge.

History 
The bridge, designed by the architect Angelo Vescovali, was built between 1896 and 1901, to replace the temporary Passerella di Ripetta, dating back to 1878. It was inaugurated on 25 May 1901 and named after Camillo Benso, Count of Cavour, one of the pioneers of Italian unification.

Description 

 Metro stop (Spagna, line A)

See also
John Craig

Notes

Bibliography 

Cavour
Bridges completed in 1901
1901 establishments in Italy
Road bridges in Italy
Rome R. IV Campo Marzio
Rome R. XXII Prati